Traditionally, women in Singapore played a small role in the country's political scene. Since 1984, Singapore has seen an increase in female representation as more women chose to run for political office.

Notable female politicians include the two former ministers: former Acting Minister for Community Development Seet Ai Mee and former Minister in the Prime Minister's Office Lim Hwee Hua; Minister of State Yu-Foo Yee Shoon; and Amy Khor Lean Suan, a district mayor. Several women also became Nominated members of parliament, representing a range of societal interests such as women's groups and conservation groups. On 1 October 2015, Grace Fu was appointed the Minister for Culture, Community and Youth.

History of women in politics

Early years
Unlike other countries, like the United Kingdom and the United States, Singapore practised universal suffrage since democratic elections began.

The first women representatives in the Legislative Council reflected English-educated and middle-class interests. Chinese-educated women leaders came into prominence as the proportion of women voters expanded from 8% to 50% in the 1955 elections. However, some of these Chinese-educated leaders, such as Linda Chen Mock Hock, were linked to communism and thus were subsequently repressed by the fiercely anti-communist Lim Yew Hock administration.

As the People's Action Party rose to power in 1959, as many as four female PAP candidates were voted into the self-governing Assembly. They included Women League's founders Chan Choy Siong and Ho Puay Choo. The PAP-Barisan Sosialis schism caused two women members to defect to the Barisan Sosialis.

Absence of female representation
With the retirement of Chan Choy Siong in 1970, there were no women in parliament for 14 years from 1970 to 1984. Nonetheless, there were sporadic failed electoral bids by female opposition candidates.

Return of female representation
In 1984, the dominant PAP fielded 3 women candidates who all entered parliament successfully. They were Dixie Tan, Aline Wong, and then Minister of State Yu-Foo Yee Shoon. Seet Ai Mee, joined the trio in 1988, and she subsequently was promoted to Acting Minister for Community Development. Widely expected to be promoted to full minister after the 1991 General Election, Seet lost her seat in Parliament to Singapore Democratic Party’s Ling How Doong in election. Lim Hwee Hua eventually became the first female Cabinet minister in 2009 when she was appointed Minister in the Prime Minister's Office. However, she lost her parliamentary seat to the Workers Party team in Aljunied GRC in the 2011 General Election.

The ruling PAP Women's Wing was formed in 1989. In 1992, Kanwaljit Soin became the first female Nominated Member of Parliament and played a major role in raising important social issues, such as violence against women, in the parliament. Other notable NMPs include Claire Chiang and Braema Mathiaparanam.

Current women parliamentarians 
Since the 1990s, the number of women participating in politics has progressively increased. There are currently 27 elected women parliamentarians out of a total of 93 elected members, 24 from the ruling PAP and three from the Workers' Party, while there is one NCMP from the Progress Singapore Party. There are three full Ministers, two Senior Ministers of State, three Ministers of State and one Parliamentary Secretary.

Elected MPs

NCMPs

Women in opposition
In 2003, Sylvia Lim, a lecturer at Temasek Polytechnic, became the first female Chairman of the Workers' Party (WP). She became the first female elected MP not from the PAP in 2011, although she had served as non-constituency MP from 2006.

The second woman opposition member to be elected was Lee Li Lian, also from the WP, after she won the Punggol East by-election in 2013. However, she lost her seat in the 2015 general election.

He Ting Ru and Raeesah Khan are the third and fourth opposition members to be elected into Parliament after they won Sengkang GRC in 2020. Both are from the WP; the latter is currently the youngest and first opposition MP from a minority race.

References 

Wong Aline and Leong, W. K., Singapore Women: Three Decades of Change, Singapore: Times Academic Press, 1993.

External links
LIST OF CURRENT MPs

Politics of Singapore